Antonis Stergiakis (born 16 March 1999) is a Greek professional footballer who plays as a goalkeeper for Super League club Panetolikos.

Club career

Slavia Sofia 
After spending time at Aris' academies, he played in the Greek third tier with Thyella Filota in 2015. Greek giants Olympiacos held talks with Stergiakis but the goalkeeper wanted first-team football and chose to go on trial with Slavia Sofia. Stergiakis joined Bulgarian Slavia Sofia in August 2015. He became the first choice goalkeeper for the U19 team and was an unused substitute in five matches during the 2015–16 season. In the beginning of August 2016 he was on trial in the Italian Roma. He travelled to Trigoria for a trial but turned down the offer to move to the primavera squad.

On 21 August 2016, Stergiakis made his debut for Slavia coming as a substitute in the 74th minute in a 4–0 away loss against Levski Sofia.

On 10 April 2017, Stergiakis was officially nominated for the 2017 Golden Boy Award, becoming only the second Greek footballer to receive such a 2017 nomination alongside Lazaros Lamprou. After impressing the goalkeeping coach, Stergiakis signed a five-year contract.

On 29 June 2019, Stergiakis, was the only Greek player included in Tuttosport's list of the world's top-100 footballers at the U21 level.

Blackburn Rovers 
On 6 October 2020, Stergiakis joined Championship side Blackburn Rovers on a three-year-deal, with the club having the option to extend the contract by a further 12 months.

Panetolikos 
On 26 May 2022, Stergiakis joined Super League club Panetolikos on a three-year deal.

International career
In November 2018, Stergiakis was called up by Greece U21 for the first time and appeared as an unused substitute in the 2019 European Under-21 Championship qualification play-offs against Austria. He made his under-21 debut on 26 March 2019, in a friendly at home against Montenegro, which ended 1–1. His final appearance for the U21 national team came in the form of a 5-0 defeat in the side's 2021 European Under-21 Championship qualifiers game against Croatia on 3 September 2020.

Career statistics

Honours
Slavia Sofia
 Bulgarian Cup: 2017–18

References

External links
Antonis Stergiakis Official Website

Living people
1999 births
Greek footballers
Greece under-21 international footballers
Greece youth international footballers
PFC Slavia Sofia players
Blackburn Rovers F.C. players
Panetolikos F.C. players
First Professional Football League (Bulgaria) players
English Football League players
Super League Greece players
Association football goalkeepers
Footballers from Thessaloniki
Greek expatriate footballers
Greek expatriate sportspeople in England
Greek expatriate sportspeople in Bulgaria
Expatriate footballers in England
Expatriate footballers in Bulgaria